Head Up High may refer to:

 Head Up High (Morcheeba album), 2013
 Head Up High (Pandora album), 2011
 Head Up High, an album and its title track by Michael "Fitz" Fitzpatrick, 2021
 "Head Up High" (Oh Land song), 2014
 "Head Up High", a song by Black Rebel Motorcycle Club from B.R.M.C., 2001